Cambajuva is a genus of flowering plants belonging to the family Poaceae.

Its native range is Brazil.

Species:

Cambajuva ulei

References

Poaceae
Poaceae genera